SMS V2 was a V1-class torpedo boat of the Imperial German Navy. The ship was built by AG Vulcan, completing in 1912. She served in the First World War with the German High Seas Fleet, taking part in the Battle of the Heligoland Bight in 1914 and the Battle of Jutland in 1916. She was retained by the post-war German Navy and was stricken in 1929 and scrapped.

Construction and design
In 1911, the Imperial German Navy placed orders for a flotilla of 12 torpedo boats as part of its shipbuilding programme for that year, with one half flotilla of six ordered from AG Vulcan, and six from Germaniawerft. The 1911 torpedo boats were smaller than those ordered in recent years in order to be more manoeuvrable and so work better with the fleet, which resulted in the numbering series for torpedo boats being restarted. The reduction in size resulted in the ships' seaworthiness being adversely affected, with the 1911 torpedo boats and the similar craft of the 1912 programme acquiring the disparaging nickname "Admiral Lans' cripples".

V2, yard number 318, was launched from Vulcan's Stettin, Prussia (now Szczecin in Poland) shipyard on 14 October 1911 and commissioned on 12 January 1912.

Armament consisted of two  SK L/30 naval guns in single mounts fore and aft, together with four 50 cm (19.7 in) torpedo tubes with one reload torpedo carried. Up to 18 mines could be carried. In 1916 the L/30 guns were replaced by more powerful  SK L/45 guns. In 1921 she was rearmed with two 10.5 cm SK L/45 naval guns and two 50 cm torpedo tubes, and was fitted with new boilers, while her forecastle was extended rearwards, eliminating the exposed well-deck forward of the ship's bridge. The ship had a crew of 74 officers and other ranks.

Service
In May 1913 V2 was a member of the 9th Half-Flotilla, 5th Torpedo Boat Flotilla, and remained part of the 9th Half-Flotilla in May 1914.

First World War
On 28 August 1914, a British force of destroyers and cruisers supported by battlecruisers made a sortie into the Heligoland Bight in order to ambush German torpedo boats on patrol, which caused the Battle of Heligoland Bight. The 5th Torpedo Boat Flotilla, including V2, were sent out from Heligoland to investigate sightings of British submarines (which were deployed as bait to draw out German ships), and ran into several British destroyers. The Flotilla then turned away to try and escape the trap, but the torpedo boat , which along with  could not make full speed and lagged behind the rest of the flotilla, was hit by British shells before the arrival of the German cruiser  allowed the 5th Flotilla to escape. In total, however, three German light cruisers (and ) and one torpedo boat of the German outer screen had been sunk.

On 23 January 1915, a German force of Battlecruisers and light cruisers, escorted by torpedo boats, and commanded by Admiral Franz von Hipper, made a sortie to attack British fishing boats on the Dogger Bank. V2, part of the 10th Torpedo Boat Half-Flotilla of the 5th Torpedo Boat Flotilla, formed part of the escort for Hipper's force. British Naval Intelligence was warned of the raid by radio messages decoded by Room 40, and sent out the Battlecruiser Force from Rosyth, commanded by Admiral Beatty aboard  and the Harwich Force of light cruisers and destroyers, to intercept the German force. The British and German Forces met on the morning of 24 January in the Battle of Dogger Bank. On sighting the British, Hipper ordered his ships to head south-east to escape the British, who set off in pursuit. The armoured cruiser  was disabled by British shells and was sunk, but the rest of the German force escaped, with the German battlecruiser  and the British battlecruiser  badly damaged. On 15 April 1915, V2, searching for the British submarine , which had torpedoed and damaged the Sperrbrecher (or auxiliary minesweeper) Schwarzwald on 14 April, dropped several depth charges on an oil slick south of the Amrum Bank thought to from a submarine. Further searches by minesweepers could not find any hint of the suspected submarine, and in fact, E5 had already left the German Bight by the time V2 carried out her attack.

At the Battle of Jutland on 31 May–1 June 1916, V2 was part of the 9th Half-Flotilla, 5th Torpedo Boat Flotilla, operating in support of the main German battle fleet. V2 and V6 rescued the survivors from V4 before V6 scuttled V4 with shellfire and a torpedo.

Postwar service
V2 survived the war, and was one of the twelve destroyers that the Reichsmarine was allowed to retain under the Treaty of Versailles. She was stricken on 18 November 1929 and was sold for scrap on 25 March 1930 for 61000 Reichsmark and broken up at Wilhelmshaven.

Notes

References

Bibliography

 
 
 

 

Torpedo boats of the Imperial German Navy
Ships built in Stettin
1911 ships
World War I torpedo boats of Germany
V1-class destroyers